Roger Fanning (born 1962 in Millington, Tennessee) is an American poet.

Life
He teaches in the low-residency Warren Wilson MFA program out of Goddard College. He lives in Seattle with his wife and son.

His work is noted for its ironic sincerity and exaltation of the mundane.

Awards
 1992 Whiting Award
 National Poetry Series for The Island Itself

Works

Books
  (1st edition 1991)

Anthologies

Poems
"Australia"; "Henry", The Drunken Boat, Spring 2000
"Poet's Choice: Hospital Sidewalk." Selected by Mary Karr. The Washington Post, October 19, 2008

References

External links
Profile at The Whiting Foundation

American male poets
1962 births
Living people
People from Millington, Tennessee
Writers from Seattle
21st-century American poets
21st-century American male writers